Jolyon Coy (born 9 March 1985) is an English actor and writer. He won a drama scholarship to Latymer Upper School in Hammersmith, then trained at LAMDA, graduating in 2007.

Theatre credits
Toby Maitland in the premiere of POSH at the Royal Court which subsequently transferred to the Duke of York's.
Mortimer in Edward ll at the Manchester Royal Exchange.
John in Wendy and Peter Pan for the RSC.
Pom in Our Boys at the Duchess Theatre.
Tekla in Creditors at the Young Vic.
Philip Of France in Holy Warriors at Shakespeare's Globe.	 
Alfred in Little Eyolf for Richard Eyre at the Almeida Theatre.
Octavius in Anthony & Cleopatra and Gratiano in the Merchant Of Venice with Jonathan Pryce as Shylock at Shakespeare's Globe.
Matthew in Rules For Living at the Rose Theatre.

Filmography

Film
 Texas Chainsaw Massacre
Rare Beasts
Thanks For The Memories
Beauty and the Beast
Testament of Youth
The Fifth Estate
The Deep Blue Sea

Television
Pete Versus Life
Henry IV, Part I and Part II (The Hollow Crown)
The Whale
Mr Selfridge
War & Peace
Midsomer Murders
The Windsors
Genius
Peaky Blinders

Personal life

His parents are Jonathan Coy and Louisa Rix.

He married Blanche Schofield, daughter of David Schofield and Lally Percy, in 2015.

His grandfather was the legendary farce actor Brian Rix.

His sister Charlotte is married to Tom Mison.

References

1985 births
Living people
21st-century English male actors
Alumni of the London Academy of Music and Dramatic Art
English male film actors
English male stage actors
English male television actors
Male actors from London
People from Hammersmith